Evan Williams (born 20 September 1989 in Rotorua, New Zealand) is a professional squash player who represents New Zealand. He reached a career-high world ranking of World No. 67 in June 2021.

References

External links 
 
 
 

New Zealand male squash players
Living people
1989 births
Sportspeople from Rotorua
Squash players at the 2018 Commonwealth Games
Commonwealth Games competitors for New Zealand